Yorkston is a surname. Notable people with the surname include:

James Yorkston (born 1971), Scottish musician, singer-songwriter, and author
John Yorkston (born 1954), Scottish investor

See also
 Yorkstone
 Yorkton
 Yorston